Harold Thuringer (born October 21, 1934) is a Canadian former politician, who represented Notre-Dame-de-Grâce in the National Assembly of Quebec from 1987 to 1989.

Thuringer was born in Vibank, Saskatchewan. A social worker, Thuringer was elected to the legislature in a by-election in 1987, following the resignation of Reed Scowen. He was defeated in the 1989 election by Gordon Atkinson of the Equality Party.

Electoral record

References

External links

1934 births
Living people
Quebec Liberal Party MNAs
Anglophone Quebec people
People from Vibank, Saskatchewan